Surabhi (also known as  Sri Venkateswara Surabhi Theatre) is a family theatre group based in Hyderabad, Telangana, India. The group performs plays based on stories from Hindu mythology and the Puranas.

History
The Surabhi theatre group was formed by Vanarasa Govinda Rao in 1885 in Surabhi, a village in the Kadapa District of Andhra Pradesh. Rao's adopted father was involved with the traditional shadow puppetry of Andhra Pradesh, tholu bommalata. After his death, Rao took over the group, gradually replacing the puppets with live actors.

In 1885, Rao was invited to host a live drama at a wedding by the elders of Surabhi. His acting troupe performed the play Keechaka Vadham, traditionally depicted using leather puppets, as a live drama.

Sri Vanarasa Govindarao, founder of Surabhi Theatres, had a family of 3 sons and 10 daughters. Except the eldest son, all the others spent their lives in the theatre and were trained for it. When the family started growing in numbers, the daughters with their husbands started establishing their own theatre groups.

The fifth daughter, Smt. Subhadramma and her husband Sri R. Venkatarao established Sri Venkateshwara Natya Mandali (Surabhi) in 1937 in Jimidipeta village of Srikakulam District of Andhra Pradesh. The wife and husband were assisted by their children Dasaradhirao and Bhojaraju. The theatre group started growing and is now one of the biggest surviving groups with 55 members. Smt. R. Subhadramma has specialised in doing male roles, particularly characters like Duryodhana in Mahabharata. She was awarded the title of 'Kala Praveena' by Sangeeta Nataka Akademi of Andhra Pradesh. In addition, both the husband and wife received many honors from various organizations of the state. Since their death, their sons are now managing the theatre.

Under the guidance of Padma Shri B.V. Karanth, the organization learned three plays: Bhishma (1996), organized by the National School of Drama (New Delhi), Chandi Priya (1997) by Alarippu (New Delhi), and Basthi Devatha Yaadamma ("The Good Women of Setzuan" written by Bertolt Brecht) (1998). B.V. Karanth not only directed these three plays for the group but also provided music for all three plays.

The group live together and travel from place to place to perform in specially erected halls. The group stays at each place for three months to a year, depending on public response. As a repertory group, they present 26 plays.

Achievements
 Surabhi Theatre's Sri R.Nageswara rao (babji) was awarded the Padma Shri in 2013.
 Surabhi's 6th-generation director Sri Surabhi Jayachandra Varma received the Ustad Bismillah Khan Yuva Puraskar Award in 2016 from Sangeet Natak Akademi, New Delhi.

Performances
 Participated 5 times in Bharat Rang Mahotsav, presented by NSD New Delhi and the 15th Bharat Rang Mahothsav
 Aaderanjali Theatre Festival, B.V. Karanth Smruthi Samaroh, Bharath Bhavan, Bhopal (2014)
 Shri Keremaner Shambu Hegde "Rashtriya Natyothsava" - 4 and 5 (two times), Gunavanthe, Karnataka state
 Bahurupi Theatre Festival, Mysore (2014)
 Mudradi Theatre Festival, Mudradi, Udipi, Karnataka (2014)
 In May 2013, the group played outside India for the first time, with performances at theatre festivals in Paris and Metz.
 Sangeet Naatak Akademi Festival of Drama (2012, New Delhi)
 Participated in the 2011 Mahabharatha Festival, Indira Gandhi National Centre for the Arts, New Delhi
 Indira Gandhi National Centre for the Arts, New Delhi and the National School of Drama jointly presented as International Theatre Festival for a fortnight in 2010
 Participated in the National Theatre Festival jointly presented by the National School of Drama, New Delhi and the Government of Assam at Tejpur and Gawhati
 Participated in the National Theatre Festival presented by the National School of Drama, New Delhi for 15 days
 Three dramas each day for three days at Evam Entertainment, Chennai
 Three dramas each day for three days at Ranga Shankara, Bangalore
 Participated in Nandikar 15th National Drama Festival (1998, Kolkatta)

Plays enacted
 Sri Krishna Leelalu: The Exploits of Little Krishna
 Jai Pathala Bhairavi: The Story of Folk Legend Thota Ramudu
 Lavakusa: The Exploits of Twin Prince Lava and Kusa, Sons of Srirama
 Bhakta Prahlada: The Tale of Prahlada, the Devoted Child
 Maya Bazar: The Tale of Demon King Ghatothkacha
 Braham Gari Charitra
 Bala Nagamma: The Story of a Wicked Sorcerer
 Chandi Priya

References

External links
 Official website

Theatre companies in India
Culture of Andhra Pradesh